Montrevault-sur-Èvre (literally Montrevault on Èvre) is a commune in the Maine-et-Loire department in western France. Montrevault is the municipal seat.

History 
It was established on 15 December 2015 and consists of the former communes of La Boissière-sur-Èvre, Chaudron-en-Mauges, La Chaussaire, Le Fief-Sauvin, Le Fuilet, Montrevault, Le Puiset-Doré, Saint-Pierre-Montlimart, Saint-Quentin-en-Mauges, Saint-Rémy-en-Mauges and La Salle-et-Chapelle-Aubry.

Population

See also 
Communes of the Maine-et-Loire department

References 

Communes of Maine-et-Loire
States and territories established in 2015
Andes (Andecavi)